Cockerell is a surname, and may refer to:

People
Allan Cockerell (1891–1975), New Zealand soldier and politician
Catherine Cockerell Cobb (1903–1995), British jeweler, silversmith, daughter of Douglas
Charles Robert Cockerell (1788–1863), British architect, son of Samuel
Christabel Cockerell (1860–1903), British artist
Christopher Cockerell (1910–1999), British inventor of the hovercraft, son of Sydney
Douglas Cockerell (1870–1945), British bookbinder, brother of Sydney
Florence Kingsford Cockerell (1871–1949), English illustrator and calligrapher, wife of Sydney
Frederick Pepys Cockerell (1833–1878), British architect
John Cockerell (1845–1937), English football player
Mark Cockerell, American figure skater
Michael Cockerell (born 1940), British maker of political documentaries
Samuel Pepys Cockerell (1754–1827), British architect
Stanley Cockerell (1895–1940), World War I flying ace
Sydney Cockerell (1867–1962), British museum curator and secretary to William Morris, brother of Theodore, husband of Florence
Theodore Dru Alison Cockerell (1866–1948), zoologist, husband of Wilmatte, brother of Sydney
Wilmatte Porter Cockerell (1869–1957), botanist, entomologist and teacher, wife of Theodore

Fictional characters
Cockerell (character), a character in Cornelia Funke's novel Inkheart.

See also
Cockerell Peninsula, a peninsula in Antarctica
Cockerel, another name for a rooster
Cockerill, a surname

 English-language surnames